A cuddy is a small room or cupboard, particularly on a boat. Sometimes a cuddy refers to a small but cosy hut. The origin of the term is not clear. Cuddy was in use in colonial America as early as 1655.  The term may derive from the Dutch kajuit, meaning a small cabin, or from the French cahute, meaning a hut.

Nautical uses
The term cuddy is used particularly in nautical contexts. In the 19th century it referred to a saloon cabin at the stern of immigrant ships, where wealthy immigrants could travel in greater comfort than the steerage passengers below.

A cuddy boat is a boat with a small shelter cabin with maybe a small head. It may have a small berth also. The cuddy on cuddy boats is usually not tall enough to stand in. The term "cuddy cabin", is still somewhat used (cuddy itself can mean cabin), and is a common term among small boaters. Cuddy boats are popular as recreational boats with people who want a little shelter and storage space but do not want to upgrade to a full cabin boat. Cuddy cabin fishing boats are also used as near-shore fishing boats.

References

Nautical terminology
Boat types